Caballar is a municipality located in the province of Segovia, Castile and León, Spain. 
According to the 2004 census (INE), the municipality had a population of 104 inhabitants.

References

Municipalities in the Province of Segovia